The Underground Spiritual Game is a compilation of twelve tracks by Fela Kuti, selected and mixed by Blackalicious producer Chief Xcel.

Track listing
"Intro" – 0:26
"Ololufe Mi" – 1:08
"Trouble Sleep Yanga Wake Am" – 2:35
"Look and Laugh" – 4:18
"Mr Grammarticologylisationalism Is the Boss" – 8:02
"Monkey Banana" – 2:19
"Ariya" – 5:27
"Unnecessary Begging" – 8:35
"Swegbe & Pako" – 3:37
"Mr. Follow Follow" – 5:52
"Africa Center of the World" – 17:22

References 

2004 compilation albums
Fela Kuti albums
World music compilation albums